Lewis Robert George Baines (born 10 October  1998) is an English professional footballer who plays as a defender for Altrincham.

Career
Baines turned professional with Fleetwood Town in the summer of 2017, and spent loan spells with Bamber Bridge and Ashton United before signing a new contract in July 2018. He made his senior debut on 13 November 2018 in the EFL Trophy. He moved on loan to Chorley in December 2018, and to Stockport County in January 2019.

On 25 July 2019, Baines completed a permanent deal to join newly promoted National League side Chorley.

On 30 May 2022, Baines returned to the National League to join Altrincham for an undisclosed fee.

International career
On 28 March 2022, he was called-up to the England C squad for the friendly against Wales C in Caernarfon. He came on for the final fifteen minutes as a substitute in the 4–0 defeat.

Career statistics

Honours
Ashton United
Northern Premier League Premier Division play-offs: 2017–18

References

1998 births
Living people
English footballers
Fleetwood Town F.C. players
Bamber Bridge F.C. players
Ashton United F.C. players
Chorley F.C. players
Stockport County F.C. players
Altrincham F.C. players
National League (English football) players
Northern Premier League players
Association football defenders